RoboRiders was a short-lived Lego theme launched in 2000, following the Throwbots/Slizers, and preceding Bionicle.
                                 
A total of seven official sets and four promotional sets were released while this series lasted. Special cans, when exposed to cold temperatures, would reveal codes used to play an online game. RoboRiders is the last line of action toys created in the Lego Technic line before Bionicle.

Types

Power RoboRider 
Power's City-Realm is not a safe place to be. This world is a huge city with acid rain, toxic fumes and several highways with broken paths that are hard to cross. Power has giant cranes for his enemies. Power is armed with two plasma cannons and a wheel launcher. His color is yellow.

Frost RoboRider 
Frost's Ice-Realm is known for temperatures far below frost temperatures; almost reaching . It also has dangerous wind-ice storms and is filled with frozen obstacles. Ice caves, thorns and monsters are everywhere, as well as ice monsters. Frost can shoot ice-spears and also has a wheel launcher. He is colored white and gray.

Lava RoboRider 
Lava's Magma-Realm is filled extreme heat, molten lava spewing out of volcanoes as well as constant rains of fire. Lava monsters are his main enemy. He is capable of swinging his dual axes, and is armed with a wheel launcher as well. He is colored red.

Swamp RoboRider 
Swamp searches for the virus in the murky Swamp-Realm that is filled with deep holes, slippery pathways, and a jungle full of entangled vines. Swamp's enemies are large blue blobs that emerge from the water. He is armed with twin Katanas to cut through thick vegetation, and is also armed with a wheel launcher. He is colored lime and turquoise.

Onyx RoboRider 
Onyx stays firmly in his Rock-Realm where he searches in the large mountain caverns and caves, but this is not truly a safe place since there is almost total darkness and Onyx is the only one known to be able to see perfectly well in this realm. His adversaries are giant rock monsters. His weapons are twin laser-beams and a wheel launcher. His color is black.

Dust RoboRider 
Dust searches for the enemies in the much-dreaded Desert-Realm. There are howling sandstorms that are very difficult to navigate through, the terrain is very tough to drive in, and there is always a danger of drowning in quicksand or monster sandstorms. Dust's main enemies are the sand pits. Dust is armed with two spears, and is also armed with a wheel launcher. His colors are tan and gray.

Boss RoboRider 
(The last set ever released in this LEGO toyline) No description has been given so it will remain unknown if he is the evil RoboRider that launched the virus or if he is the commander of the other RoboRiders. The Desert-Realm and the Ice-Realm are pictured on the packaging for the set. His elements are unknown and his color is orange.

Wheels 
Two unique wheels were released on each set, a different color each time, Lego said these wheels had special powers, however no information was ever released on what powers these wheels had, only names: Axer, Blazooka, Chain-Saw, Driller, Dynamite, Flame, Fuel, Grab, Laser, Ninja, Rope, Scout, Skeleton, Stunner, Toxic and Twin-Saw.

Promotional Sets 
Four promotional sets were given out by the Kabaya Candy Corp based on four of the RoboRiders. They were never mentioned in the storyline. 

Swamp Craft (Swamp)
Ice Explorer (Frost)
Volcano Climber (Lava)
Dirt Bike (Power)

RoboRiders
Products introduced in 2000
Fictional robots